James E. Miller Jr. (1920–2010) was an American scholar and the Helen A. Regenstein Professor Emeritus of English Language and Literature at the University of Chicago, where he completed his graduate work, taught, and served as chairman of the English department.

He has also served previously as president of the Midwest Modern Language Association, president of the Nation Council of Teachers of English, beginning in 1969, and editor of the journal College English.  He served as an editorial adviser to the journals Modern Philology, Critical Inquiry, Studies in American Fiction, and American Poetry.

Specializing in American literature, he published over twenty books and various articles on authors such as T. S. Eliot, Herman Melville, and Walt Whitman.  His books include T. S. Eliot’s Personal Wasteland: Exorcism of the Demons, T. S. Eliot: The Making of an American Poet, The American Quest for a Supreme Fiction: Whitman’s Legacy in the Personal Epic, Leaves of Grass: America’s Lyric-Epic of Self and Democracy, F. Scott Fitzgerald: His Art and His Technique, Theory of Fiction: Henry James, and Quests Surd and Absurd: Essays in American Literature. He also has edited the anthology Heritage of American Literature, a Critical Guide to Leaves of Grass, and a Reader’s Guide to Herman Melville.  His work on Eliot considers personal correspondence and the accounts of friends as well as an in-depth reading of Eliot’s early work up to and including The Waste Land.  Miller also contends that though Eliot lived in England much of his life, he remained quintessentially an American writer.  Miller's early work on J. D. Salinger was among the first work of its kind to be published.  Throughout his career, Miller traveled and taught extensively in Japan, Australia, France, Italy, and elsewhere.

Notes

References
Haegert, John: “James E. Miller: An American Scholar.” Modern Philology. 8.1 (1990). 1–2.
Miller, James E.: T. S. Eliot: The Making of an American Poet. University Park, Pennsylvania. The Pennsylvania State University Press. 2005.

University of Chicago faculty
1920 births
2010 deaths